Titanium(II) oxide (TiO) is an inorganic chemical compound of titanium and oxygen. It can be prepared from titanium dioxide and titanium metal at 1500 °C. It is non-stoichiometric in a range TiO0.7 to TiO1.3  and this is caused by vacancies of either Ti or O in the defect rock salt structure. In pure TiO 15% of both Ti and O sites are vacant,  as the vacancies allow metal-metal bonding between adjacent Ti centres. Careful annealing can cause ordering of the vacancies producing a monoclinic form which has 5 TiO units in the primitive cell that exhibits lower resistivity. A high temperature form with titanium atoms with trigonal prismatic coordination is also known. Acid solutions of TiO are stable for a short time then decompose to give hydrogen:

2 Ti2+(aq) + 2 H+(aq) → 2 Ti3+(aq) + H2(g)

Gas-phase TiO shows strong bands in the optical spectra of cool (M-type) stars. In 2017, TiO was claimed to be detected in an exoplanet atmosphere for the first time; a result which is still debated in the literature. Additionally, evidence has been obtained for the presence of the diatomic molecule TiO in the interstellar medium.

References

Titanium(II) compounds
Non-stoichiometric compounds
Transition metal oxides
Rock salt crystal structure